Wisil is a town in the north-central Mudug region of Somalia. It lies west of the city of Hobyo, on the road towards Galkacyo. The town is administered by the autonomous Galmudug state government.

References
Wisil

Populated places in Mudug
Galmudug